Reggina Calcio finally dropped out of Serie A, following seven years of balancing around the drop zone. Following its previous six years, the club had stayed in Serie A by less than three points on all occasions. In 2008–09, Reggina dropped off the pace mid-season and was nowhere near survival.

Squad

Goalkeepers
  Christian Puggioni
  Andrea Campagnolo
  Pietro Marino

Defenders
  Andrea Costa
  Bruno Cirillo
  Francesco Cosenza
  Antonio Giosa
  Carlos Valdez
  Matej Krajčík
  Pablo Álvarez
  Santos
  Basso
  Maurizio Lanzaro

Midfielders
  Emil Hallfreðsson
  Emmanuel Cascione
  Luca Vigiani
  Édgar Barreto
  Francesco Cozza
  Paolo Barillà
  Jonis Khoris
  Nicolas Viola
  Luca Tognozzi
  Carlos Carmona
  Alessio Sestu

Attackers
  Bernardo Corradi
  Fabio Ceravolo
  Đorđe Rakić
  Franco Brienza
  Cristhian Stuani
  Davide Di Gennaro

Serie A

Matches

 Chievo-Reggina 2-1
 0-1 Bernardo Corradi (72 pen)
 1-1 Michele Marcolini (75 pen)
 2-1 Vincenzo Italiano (88)
 Reggina-Torino 1-1
 0-1 Nicola Amoruso (13)
 1-1 Marco Di Loreto (43 og)
 Roma-Reggina 3-0
 1-0 Christian Panucci (45)
 2-0 Alberto Aquilani (50)
 3-0 Simone Perrotta (90 + 3)
 Reggina-Milan 1-2
 0-1 Marco Borriello (24)
 1-1 Bernardo Corradi (75)
 1-2 Pato (83)
 Palermo-Reggina 1-0
 1-0 Fabrizio Miccoli (51)
 Reggina-Catania 1-1
 0-1 Michele Paolucci (69)
 1-1 Andrea Costa (80)
 Fiorentina-Reggina 3-0
 1-0 Giampaolo Pazzini (40 pen)
 2-0 Alberto Gilardino (75)
 3-0 Alberto Gilardino (81)
 Reggina-Lecce 2-0
 1-0 Bernardo Corradi (59 pen)
 2-0 Bernardo Corradi (90 pen)
 Napoli-Reggina 3-0
 1-0 Germán Denis (8)
 2-0 Germán Denis (16)
 3-0 Germán Denis (64)
 Reggina-Inter 2-3
 0-1 Maicon (9)
 0-2 Patrick Vieira (24)
 1-2 Francesco Cozza (34)
 2-2 Franco Brienza (53)
 2-3 Iván Córdoba (90 + 1)
 Genoa-Reggina 4-0
 1-0 Diego Milito (54 pen)
 2-0 Diego Milito (74)
 3-0 Giuseppe Sculli (81)
 4-0 Diego Milito (90)
 Udinese-Reggina 0-1
 0-1 Franco Brienza (60)
 Reggina-Atalanta 3-1
 1-0 Francesco Cozza (10)
 2-0 Bernardo Corradi (21)
 3-0 Bernardo Corradi (79)
 3-1 Cristiano Doni (90 + 4)
 Juventus-Reggina 4-0
 1-0 Mauro Camoranesi (28)
 2-0 Amauri (44)
 3-0 Giorgio Chiellini (62)
 4-0 Alessandro Del Piero (72 pen)
 Reggina-Bologna 2-2
 1-0 Bernardo Corradi (40)
 1-1 Francesco Valiani (53)
 2-1 Édgar Barreto (56)
 2-2 Marco Di Vaio (61)
 Reggina-Sampdoria 0-2
 0-1 Claudio Bellucci (75 pen)
 0-2 Marco Padalino (81)
 Cagliari-Reggina 1-1
 1-0 Robert Acquafresca (1)
 1-1 Franco Brienza (61 pen)
 Reggina-Lazio 2-3
 1-0 Bernardo Corradi (4)
 1-1 Goran Pandev (14)
 1-2 Goran Pandev (21)
 2-2 Francesco Cozza (63)
 2-3 Goran Pandev (76)
 Siena-Reggina 1-0
 1-0 Mario Frick (75)
 Reggina-Chievo 0-1
 0-1 Vincenzo Italiano (90 + 3)
 Torino-Reggina 0-0
 Reggina-Roma 2-2
 1-0 Bernardo Corradi (43 pen)
 1-1 David Pizarro (45 + 1)
 1-2 David Pizarro (57)
 2-2 Francesco Cozza (81)
 Milan-Reggina 1-1
 0-1 Davide Di Gennaro (34)
 1-1 Kaká (67 pen)
 Reggina-Palermo 0-0
 Catania-Reggina 2-0
 1-0 Ciro Capuano (35)
 2-0 Alessandro Potenza (74)
 Reggina-Fiorentina 1-1
 1-0 Alessio Sestu (21)
 1-1 Emiliano Bonazzoli (23)
 Lecce-Reggina 0-0
 Reggina-Napoli 1-1
 1-0 Bernardo Corradi (27)
 1-1 Ezequiel Lavezzi (61)
 Inter-Reggina 3-0
 1-0 Esteban Cambiasso (6)
 2-0 Zlatan Ibrahimović (10 pen)
 3-0 Zlatan Ibrahimović (58)
 Reggina-Genoa 0-1
 0-1 Thiago Motta (77)
 Reggina-Udinese 0-2
 0-1 Antonio Floro Flores (85)
 0-2 Antonio Floro Flores (90 + 1)
 Atalanta-Reggina 0-1
 0-1 Fabio Ceravolo (40)
 Reggina-Juventus 2-2
 1-0 Antonino Barillà (27)
 1-1 Alessandro Del Piero (48 pen)
 2-1 Emil Hallfreðsson (69)
 2-2 Cristiano Zanetti (72)
 Bologna-Reggina 1-2
 0-1 Franco Brienza (40)
 0-2 Édgar Barreto (46)
 1-2 Vangelis Moras (87)
 Sampdoria-Reggina 5-0
 1-0 Daniele Dessena (1)
 2-0 Daniele Dessena (31)
 3-0 Gennaro Delvecchio (36)
 4-0 Guido Marilungo (46)
 5-0 Giampaolo Pazzini (52)
 Reggina-Cagliari 2-1
 0-1 Andrea Lazzari (18)
 1-1 Fabio Ceravolo (26)
 2-1 Franco Brienza (49)
 Lazio-Reggina 1-0
 1-0 Mauro Zárate (26)
 Reggina-Siena 1-1
 1-0 Cristhian Stuani (45 pen)
 1-1 Massimo Maccarone (76)

Topscorers
  Bernardo Corradi 10
  Franco Brienza 5
  Francesco Cozza 4
  Édgar Barreto 2

Sources
  RSSSF - Italy 2008/09

Reggina 1914 seasons
Reggina